Linda L. Booth is a former apostle in the Council of Twelve Apostles of Community of Christ beginning March 31, 1998. Along with Gail E. Mengel, Booth was one of the first two women apostles in the Reorganized Church of Jesus Christ of Latter Day Saints (RLDS Church). In 2013, Booth became the first woman to be the church's president of the Council of Twelve. The RLDS Church was renamed Community of Christ in 2001.

Biography
Booth is a native of Independence, Missouri and is a graduate of the University of Kansas. She was the founding editor of Kansas City Parent Magazine and the editor of Olathe Life Newspaper in Olathe, Kansas.

Prior to becoming an RLDS Church apostle, Booth had been a pastor of the RLDS Church congregation in Olathe, Kansas, and later a counselor to the president of a high priests quorum. Immediately prior to her ordination as an apostle, she had been the assistant director of communications for the RLDS Church. Along with Gail E. Mengel, Booth was selected by RLDS Prophet–President W. Grant McMurray to be an apostle and was ordained on March 31, 1998.

As of 2012, Booth was the secretary to the Council of Twelve and oversaw missionary work in the church's Southern USA Mission Field. In 2013, she became the first woman elected to serve as president of the Council of Twelve.

Notes

American leaders of the Community of Christ
Apostles of the Community of Christ
Women Christian clergy
Writers from Independence, Missouri
University of Kansas alumni
American newspaper editors
American magazine editors
Living people
Women newspaper editors
Presidents of the Council of Twelve Apostles (Community of Christ)
Women magazine editors
Year of birth missing (living people)